USS Hawkbill (SS-366), a Balao-class submarine, was the first ship of the United States Navy to be named for the hawksbill, a large sea turtle (the "-s-" was inadvertently dropped at commissioning.).

Construction and commissioning
Hawkbill (SS-366) was launched by the  Manitowoc Shipbuilding Company in Manitowoc, Wisconsin,on 9 January 1944, sponsored by Mrs. F. W. Scanland, Jr., and commissioned on 17 May 1944.

Operational history
Following a period of training on the Great Lakes, Hawksbill departed 1 June 1944 from Manitowoc to begin the long journey down the Illinois River and finally by barge down the Mississippi. She arrived New Orleans 10 June and, after combat loading, sailed 16 June for training based at the submarine base at Balboa, Panama Canal Zone. Hawkbill signaled White Clover to cease firing and suffered no casualties or damage.

After completing her training from Balboa, Hawkbill arrived at Pearl Harbor, Hawaii, on 28 July 1944 for final preparations before her first war patrol.

First and Second War Patrols

In October Hawkbill shifted patrol to the South China Sea and, while approaching two carriers 7 October, was forced down by violent depth charging by Japanese destroyers. Two days later she attacked a 12-ship convoy with Becuna, damaging several of the ships. Hawkbill transited heavily patrolled Lombok Strait 14 October, and terminated her first patrol at Fremantle, Australia on 17 October.

She encountered a convoy 15 December and sank destroyer Momo with six well-placed torpedoes during a night attack. Finding few contacts—a testament to the effectiveness of the American submarines—Hawkbill headed once more for Lombok Strait. This time she was sighted by a patrol craft, but cleverly maneuvered into a rain squall. The submarine was then fired-upon by shore batteries before passing out of range. Hawkbill returned to Fremantle 5 January 1945.

Third and Fourth War Patrols

On her third war patrol beginning 5 February, the submarine returned to Lombok Strait to turn the tables on her former pursuers. Her torpedoes sank two submarine chasers 14 February, and she added some small craft before turning for the South China Sea. Hawkbill detected a convoy 20 February; after engaging one escort with gunfire, she sank 5,400-ton cargo ship Daizen Maru with a spread of torpedoes. The rest of her patrol brought no targets; she arrived Fremantle 6 April 1945. 

Departing on her fourth patrol 5 May, Hawkbill served on lifeguard station for a B-24 strike on the Kangean Islands north of Bali. She arrived 16 May on her patrol station off the coast of Malaya, and soon afterward encountered minelayer Hatsutaka heading south along the coast. She attacked and obtained two hits, causing severe damage. The ship was observed next morning being towed to the beach. At a range of almost , Hawkbill fired three more torpedoes into the shallow waters and broke the ship in half, sinking a familiar enemy of submarines operating on the Malayan coast. After further patrol off Malaya and in the Gulf of Siam, she arrived Subic Bay 18 June 1945.

Fifth War Patrol and Japanese Surrender

Hawkbill departed for her fifth and last war patrol 12 July. Returning to the coast of Malaya, she attacked a convoy 18 July. Her first torpedoes missed, and an hour later a depth charge attack of unusual accuracy and intensity began from the destroyer Kamikaze. Hawkbill was blown partially out of the water by a perfectly placed pattern and damaged considerably; but by hugging the bottom with all machinery secured, she eluded the attacking destroyer. After a stay at Subic Bay for repairs, she steamed to Borneo to rendezvous with Australian Army officers for a special mission. Hawkbill destroyed two radio stations with her deck guns, landed commandos at Terampha Town, and destroyed shore installations. After reconnaissance of the Anambas Islands, also in the South China Sea, the versatile submarine returned to Borneo 13 August.

Following the surrender of Japan, Hawkbill sailed to Pearl Harbor, departing 22 September 1945 for San Francisco. She decommissioned at Mare Island 30 September 1946 and joined the Reserve Fleet. Brought out of reserve in 1952, Hawkbill was given a GUPPY IB conversion and loaned to the Netherlands under the Military Assistance Program 21 April 1953.

HNLMS Zeeleeuw (S803) 

The submarine was commissioned in the Royal Netherlands Navy as HNLMS Zeeleeuw (S803), the first Dutch naval ship to be named for the sealion. Zeeleeuw reached Rotterdam 11 June, in time to participate successfully in NATO summer exercises, 'beating' the Royal Navy as well as the U.S. Navy. On 24 November 1970, Zeeleeuw was sold for scrap.

Honors and awards
Hawkbill received six battle stars for World War II service. All five of her war patrols were designated "successful," and she received a Navy Unit Commendation for her outstanding performance on patrols 1, 3, and 4.

References

Citations

Bibliography
 Hinman, Charles R., and Douglas E. Campbell. The Submarine Has No Friends: Friendly Fire Incidents Involving U.S. Submarines During World War II. Syneca Research Group, Inc., 2019. .

External links  

http://www.usshawkbill.com/366/index.htm
http://dutchsubmarines.com/boats/boat_zeeleeuw1.htm
http://www.zeeleeuw-1962.nl/index.htm

 
 

Balao-class submarines
Ships built in Manitowoc, Wisconsin
1944 ships
World War II submarines of the United States
Maritime incidents in June 1944
Friendly fire incidents of World War II
Ships transferred from the United States Navy to the Royal Netherlands Navy
Walrus-class submarines (1953)